Rue d'Argenteuil is a street in the 1st arrondissement of Paris.

Argenteuil